FYC may refer to:

 Fanny Cory (1877–1972), American illustrator and comic artist
 Fanshawe Yacht Club, a non-profit Canadian sailing club in London, Ontario
 Fine Young Cannibals, Band from Birmingham, England
 Fine Young Capitalists, a video game design company
 First-year composition
 For Your Consideration (advertising)

See also
For Your Consideration (disambiguation)